While lying on the enriched continent of Africa, Equatorial Guinea has proved to be entrenched in ancient rituals and songs. The capital island of Bioko has largely been influenced by Spanish customs and traditions during the colonial period, when education and health services were developed in the country.

Traditions
Many Bubi farmers still hold to their ancient customs. One of the country's most famous celebrations is the abira, which is believed to cleanse the community of evil.  The balélé dance is performed along the coast throughout the year and on Bioko around Christmas.

Religion, race, and language
Most people in the country are nominally Christian, but practice a combination of Roman Catholicism and traditional pagan customs.

Spanish, French, and Portuguese are the official languages of the country.

Despite a veneer of Spanish culture and of Roman Catholic religion that is thicker in Bioko than on the mainland, Equatorial Guineans live largely according to ancient customs, which have undergone a revival since independence. Among the Fang of the mainland, witchcraft, traditional music (in which the Fang harp, the xylophone, the great drums, and the wooden trumpet are used), and storytelling survive. Spanish aid is much oriented to educational and health services. Among the Bubi farmers of Bioko, some ancient customs are still followed.

Music

The Fang is known for the mvet, an instrument that looks like a cross between a zither and a harp, and can have up to fifteen strings. The semi-spherical part of this instrument is made of bamboo, and the strings are attached to the center by fibers. Music for the mvet is written in the form of musical notation that can only be learned by the initiates of the bebom-mvet society. Music is typically call and response with a chorus and drums alternating.

Musicians like Eyi Muan Ndong have helped to popularize folk styles.

Cinema
Juan Pablo Ebang Esono is one of the top filmmakers in the country. In 2010, Esono directed Teresa, the first medium-length film to be produced in Equatorial Guinea.

See also

 Raquel Ilombé: Poetry and writings

References